Llan may be:
 Llan (placename), a Celtic morpheme, or element, common in British placenames 
 A short form for any placename .
 Llan, Powys, a Welsh village near Llanbrynmair
 Llan the Sorcerer, a fictional character in Marvel Comics